Ziriklykul (Yereklekül) is a rural locality (a village) in Bogdanovsky Selsoviet, Miyakinsky District, Bashkortostan, Russia. The population was 71 as of 2010. There are 4 streets.

Geography 
Ziriklykul is located 29 km southwest of Kirgiz-Miyaki (the district's administrative centre) by road. Tamyan-Taymas is the nearest rural locality.

References 

Rural localities in Miyakinsky District